The Uyunid dynasty were an Arab dynasty that ruled Eastern Arabia for 163 years, from the 11th to the 13th centuries. Their sect is disputed; some sources mention they were Shia, others Sunni. They were the remnants of Banu Abdul Qays tribe and seized the country from the Qarmatians with the military assistance of Great Seljuq Empire in the year 1077–1078 CE. It then fell to the Usfurids of Banu Uqayl in 651 AH (1253 CE). The famous poet Ali bin al Mugrab Al Uyuni is a descendant of the Uyunids.

History

Rise
In 1077–1078, an Arab sheikh named Abdullah bin Ali Al Uyuni defeated the Qarmatians in Bahrain and al-Hasa with the help of the Seljuq Turks of Baghdad and founded the Uyunid dynasty.

Then Al-Fadhl, son of Abdullah, transferred his capital to Qatif, then to Awal (today’s state of Bahrain). In his reign, the state extended to Kuwait. Then in 513 H. the Capital went back to Qatif. In 531 AH Mohammed son of Al Fadhl I was assassinated, and his state was divided into two, one in al-Hasa and the other in Qatif.

Expansion
Under Muhammad b. Ahmad b. Abu'l-Hussin b. Abu Sinan, the Uyunids' territory stretched from Najd to the Syrian desert. Due to the influence of the Uyunid kingdom, Caliph al-Nasir li-Din Allah gave Muhammad b. Ahmad authority to protect the pilgrimage route to Mecca. Muhammad was later murdered by a family member, instigated by his cousin, Gharir b. Shukr b. Ali. In the years 587 – 605 AH, Mohammed bin Abi al-Hussain united Qatif and Al-Hasa. He restores the glory of the Uyunids, and extends the state to Najd central Arabia. The state was divided again after his assassination in 605 H.

Religion
The Uyunids were Muslim, however their sect is disputed; some sources mention they were Shia, others Sunni. According to Nakash, the populations of Bahrain, Hasa, and Qatif, may have accepted Twelver Shi'ism during this period. A study by Nayef al-Shera'an stated they were Shia based on their coins, which he said were exhibited at the British Museum. The study also mentions that no reliable sources support they were Sunni. On the other hand, Iraqi Sunni historian Safa Khulusi said they were Sunni, shortly before stating he had a "strong feeling" that poet Ali bin al Mugrab Al Uyuni was a Zaydi Shia.

See also
 Abdul Qays
 History of Bahrain
 History of Saudi Arabia
 List of Muslim empires and dynasties

References

 
Arab dynasties
Bahraini monarchs
Muslim dynasties
Abd al-Qays
Middle Eastern royal families
Arab slave owners